The Revised Fire Code of the Philippines of 2008, officially codified as Republic Act No. 9514, is a consolidation of Senate Bill No. 2553 and House Bill No. 4115, enacted and passed the Senate and the House of Representatives on October 6, 2008 and October 8, 2008, respectively. It was signed into law by President Gloria Macapagal Arroyo on December 19, 2008. 

This Act repealed Presidential Decree No. 1185, as amended, otherwise known as the "Fire Code of the Philippines", dated August 26, 1977. 

R.A. No. 9514 and R.A. No. 6975 designated and empowered the Bureau of Fire Protection as the implementing arm of the Department of the Interior and Local Government for fire control and protection, fire inspection, investigation, and search and rescue. It also penalizes acts of obstruction of emergency exits, fire hydrants and fire lanes, overcrowding, locking fire exits, smoking in fire hazard areas, the removing, destroying, obliterating, any authorized seals, signs, mark or tags, and the tampering, overloading and/or destruction of electrical wires.

References

2008 legislation
Fire prevention law
Firefighting in the Philippines
Presidency of Gloria Macapagal Arroyo